De la Merced (Spanish for: Of the Mercy) may refer to:

Things

Rancho Laguna de la Merced, Mexican land grant
Convento de la Merced, the Church of San Pedro
Nuestra Señora de la Merced y San Judas Tadeo, Montevideo
Basilica of Nuestra Señora de la Merced (Lima)
Basílica de Nuestra Señora de la Merced (Quito)

People
Mosco de la Merced I (born 1977), Mexican luchador or professional wrestler
Mosco de la Merced II (born 1964), Mexican luchador
José de Elduayen, 1st Marquis of the Pazo de la Merced (1823–1898)

See also
La Merced (disambiguation)
Merced, California